

A compressed file library (CFL) is designed to work as a virtual file system for programs, especially for video games. By compressing various game resources into one file, it is able to lower the number of file accesses. The resources can also be encrypted in the CFL. 

CFL is used by X-Forge, the multi-platform wireless 3D game engine developed by Fathammer Ltd. It is also used by IMVU for its 3D character models and accessories.

See also
 Doom WAD, a similar file system

References

External links
.CFL file at FILExt.com
Public domain resources including Compressed File Library

Video game development
Public-domain software with source code